St. Theresa Catholic Secondary School (STCSS) is a Roman Catholic Secondary School in Belleville, Ontario, Canada. It operates under the direction of the Algonquin and Lakeshore Catholic District School Board. The school is named after the patron saint, St. Theresa (1873–1897). St. Theresa C.S.S. is a uniform school.

Administration 
In 2012, there were over 70 teaching staff, six support staff and two administrators, led by a principal and vice-principal.

Academics 
All students who attend St. Theresa are taught under the Ontario Secondary Curriculum. From 2002 to 2004, St. Theresa had success rates below 80%, but by the 2007 school year, the success rate had risen to 92%.

In a 2012 report from the Fraser Institute that ranked Ontario secondary schools in terms of academics for the 2011–2012 school year, St. Theresa scored 6.1/10, ranking it 378th out of the 725 Ontario secondary schools included in the report. Out of the other high schools in the Algonquin and Lakeshore Catholic District School Board, St. Theresa Catholic Secondary School received the lowest score in terms of academic achievement, behind St. Paul Secondary School, which scored 6.8/10. The decline in academics in recent years is a startling one, as St. Theresa had maintained an exceptionally high academic standing in years past, having ranked highest in the school board during the 2010–2011 school year with a score of 8.6/10. Despite this decline, St. Theresa Catholic Secondary School's score was still above the provincial average.

The Fraser Institute's results for the 2013 school year noted that STCSS had made significant improvements, rising to a score of 6.7/10, ranking it 273rd out of 740 Ontario secondary schools. In terms of school board rankings, STCSS tied for the lowest score in the ALCDSB with Holy Cross Catholic Secondary School in Kingston.

The gains of the 2013 school year were not built upon in 2014, as the Fraser Institute's results marked that the school had declined to 6.2/10, bringing it down to rank 392nd out of the 749 Ontario secondary schools. This score just surpassed the provincial average of around 6/10 and making it the lowest ranking secondary school in the ALCDSB, with the second lowest being St. Paul with a score of 6.8/10.

The 2015 school year proved to yield only greater decline, with STCSS scoring 5.7/10 and ranking 415th out of 676 Ontario secondary schools, scoring below the provincial average of about 6.0. It once again was the lowest scoring secondary school in the ALCDSB, with the next lowest score being St. Paul with a 6.5 and ranking 289/676. From 2011 to 2015, STCSS' score fell by 2.9 points, marking an era of academic decline in the 2010s.

The 2016 school year reinforced the trend of declining academics at St. Theresa Catholic Secondary School, as STCSS scored 5.5/10 and ranked 493rd out of 740 Ontario secondary schools, its worst score of the decade and possibly of its entire history and well below the provincial average of around 6.0. It tied with Holy Cross Catholic Secondary School for the lowest scoring secondary school in the ALCDSB, with the next lowest being Nicholson with a 6.2/10 and ranking 371/740. Nicholson, Regiopolis Notre Dame, and Holy Cross all experienced significant decreases along with STCSS, Holy Cross' being the worst with a drop from 7.4/10 to 5.5/10.

The 2017 school year resulted in a slight improvement for STCSS, the first increase in its ranking since 2013. It scored 5.6/10 and ranked 477th out of 747 Ontario secondary schools, still well below the provincial average of around 6.0. It retained its place as the lowest ranking secondary school in the Algonquin and Lakeshore Catholic District School Board, with the next lowest being Holy Cross Catholic Secondary School with 6.3/10. STCSS remained the only secondary school in the ALCDSB to rank below the provincial average.

STCSS' score would decline further in the 2018 school year to 5.1/10 and a rank of 536th out of 738 Ontario secondary schools, falling below the provincial average score of 6/10. STCSS was the lowest scoring secondary school in the Algonquin and Lakeshore Catholic District School Board, with the next highest score being Holy Cross Catholic Secondary School with a score of 6.2/10.

By the 2019 school year, STCSS' score had declined to 3.6/10, falling well below the provincial average of 6/10 and ranking 664th out of 739 Ontario secondary schools. It had the lowest score of all secondary schools in the Algonquin and Lakeshore Catholic District School Board, with the next highest score being Holy Cross Catholic Secondary School with a score of 5.9/10.

Facilities 
St. Theresa is equipped with a range of athletic facilities. Because of the school's close location to the Yardmen Arena, that is used for the Canadian Hockey Skills Academy classes. Because of the growing student population a new wing was built, housing a new art studio, office and life skills room. The wing was officially opened during the 2005 school year.

The school property includes two soccer fields. A walkway to the Quinte Health and Wellness Centre parking lot provides students with access to further sports facilities.

St. Theresa also has a number of off-campus classrooms that it shares with Sir James Whitney School, where welding, mechanics, cosmetology and construction programs are taught.

Athletics 
St. Theresa Catholic Secondary School offers a range of sports for students, including Curling, hockey, football (as of 2013), soccer, rugby, golf, skiing, cross-country running, track and field, basketball, baseball, volleyball, badminton, and tennis.

Hockey 

The St. Theresa girls' hockey team medalled at OFSAA 6 years in a row. The girls' team won 5–1 against Appleby College at home in 2012. They won silver in 2010, 2011 and 2015. They won bronze in 2013 and antique bronze in 2014.  On March 20, 2008, the boys' hockey team won the 2008 COSSA title, winning 8–3 against Holy Cross Secondary School (Peterborough).

Notable alumni 
 Brad Richardson, American hockey player

See also 
List of high schools in Ontario

References

External links 
 
 

Educational institutions established in 1998
High schools in Belleville, Ontario
Catholic secondary schools in Ontario
1998 establishments in Ontario